Chasing Mississippi is the second studio album released by singer-songwriter Dave Barnes. Unlike Barnes' first album, Brother, Bring The Sun, Barnes co-produced the album along with Ed Cash. Due to the success of the first album and its high calibre, Christian music veteran Amy Grant and husband, country music veteran Vince Gill both offered their talents towards the creation of this album. Barnes accepted and both appear on the album in separate songs.

Track listing

Credits

Performance

Dave Barnes: Lead Vocals, Acoustic Guitar, Electric Guitar, Tambourine, Noise, Hand Clapping
Amy Grant: Guest Vocal Harmony
Vince Gill: Electric Guitar, Vocal Harmony
Byron House: Upright Bass
Jackie Street: Bass
Dan Needham: Drums
Matt Slocum: Strings
Ed Cash: Harmonica, Percussion, Bass Drums, Electric Guitar, Background Vocals, Noise, Classical Guitar
Justin Rosolino: Bass, Electric Guitar
Calvin Turner: Bass
Ben Shive: Keyboards
Matt Wertz: Background Vocals

Technical
Dave Barnes: Producer
Ed Cash: Producer, Engineer
Bob Ludwig: Mastering

Notes

External links
DaveBarnes.com
Credits and Performance Info from Barnes & Noble

Dave Barnes albums
2006 albums